T. P. Radhamani ( – 20 October 2019) was an actress who was active in Malayalam and Tamil movies. She began her career at the age of 14. With about 105 films to her credit, the actress is best known for her role in Utharayanam. Oru Yathramozhi, the 1997 moving starring Mohanlal, was her last Malayalam film. She died on 20 October 2019 due to cancer. Her son is the actor Abhinay.

Career
She started her career at an age of 14. Her first appearance in a movie was in a song for the movie called Sindooracheppu. When actor Thilakan made his debut in the movie Periyar, Radhamani acted in the role of his sister. She has worked with actors like Prem Nazir, Sathyan, Madhu, Jayan, M.G Soman, Mammootty and also with Tamil actors including Kamal Haasan, Prabhu and Vijay Sethupathi. She has also acted along with Shah Rukh Khan for the movie 2013 movie Chennai Express. This was also her last appearance in a movie.

She is a recipient of the Kerala Sangeetha Nataka Akademi Award.

Films

Ezhu Raathrikal (1968)
Veettumrigam (1969)
Thurakkaatha Vaathil (1970)
Aa Chithrashalabham Parannotte (1970)
Abhayam (1970)
Othenante Makan (1970)
Prathidhwani (1971)
Jalakanyaka	1971
Kalithozhi 1971
Marunnattil Oru Malayali 1971
Sindooracheppu 1971
Ananthashayanam (1972)
Nrithasaala (1972)
Sathi (1972)
Chembarathi (1972)
Periyar 1973
Ladies Hostel (1973)
Periyar (1973)
Nakhangal (1973)
Pachanottukal (1973)
Prethangalude Thaazhvara (1973)
Kaalachakram (1973)
Kaattu Vithachavan (1973)
Udayam (1973)
Swapnam (1973)
Soundaryapooja (1973)
Veendum Prabhaatham (1973)
Youvanam (1974)
Arakkallan Mukkaalkkallan (1974)
College Girl
Uttarayanam 1975
Chief Guest (1975)
Cheenavala
Picnic (1975)
Agnipushpam (1976)
Romeo (1976)
Vidarunna Mottukal (1977)
Kodiyettam 1978
Sanmanassullavarkku Samaadhaanam (1986)
Oridathu 1987
Aranyakam 1988
Oozham (1988)
Innaleyude Baakki (1988)
Mudra 1989
Rugmini 1989
Aadyathe Kanmani (1995)
Kokkarakko (1995)
 Hitler (1996)
Sukhavasam (1996)
Sathyabhamakkoru Premalekhanam (1996)
Dilliwala Rajakumaran (1996)
Nandagopaalante Kusruthikal (1996)
Oru Yathramozhi (1997)
Kathanayakan (1997)
Mr. Clean (1997)
Pranayavarnangal (1998)
American Ammayi (1999)
Namukkore Koodaram (2001)
Nilaathooval (2002)
Ananthapuram Raajakumaari (2003)
Anuvaadamillaathe (2006)
Chennai Express - 2013 - Hindi film
Vanmam - 2014 - Tamil film
Mannar Vagaiyara - 2018 - Tamil film

TV Serial
Pennurimai (Doordarshan)
Snehaseema (Doordarshan)

References

Actresses in Tamil cinema
Indian film actresses
Actresses in Malayalam cinema
Actresses in Malayalam theatre
Indian stage actresses
Women artists from Kerala
Actresses in Malayalam television
1950s births
2019 deaths
Year of birth uncertain
Actresses in Hindi cinema
Recipients of the Kerala Sangeetha Nataka Akademi Award